Sclerodistomidae is a family of trematodes belonging to the order Plagiorchiida.

Genera:
 Eurycoelum Brock, 1886
 Kenmackenzia Gibson, 1983
 Prosogonotrema Vigueras, 1940
 Prosorchiopsis Dollfus, 1947
 Prosorchis Yamaguti, 1934
 Sclerodistomum Looss, 1912

References

Plagiorchiida